Carlo Boscarato (May 9, 1926 – June 12, 1987)
was an Italian cartoonist and comics artist. He was born in Treviso.

In 1971, together with writer Claudio Nizzi, Boscarato created the western series Larry Yuma. He also realized several reductions of literary masterworks such as The Treasure Island.

External links 
Biography at Fondazione Franco Fossati
Biography at Comiclopedia 

1926 births
1987 deaths
People from Treviso
Italian cartoonists
Italian comics artists